Bobo Ashanti is the tenth studio album by Jamaican reggae singer Sizzla. It was released on Greensleeves Records on August 31, 2000. The album, written by Sizzla and produced by Philip "Fatis" Burrell, peaked at #6 on the Billboard top reggae album charts and addresses themes of the Bobo Ashanti branch of the Rastafari movement.

Track listing
"The World" (Burell, Collins, Dennis, Miller) – 4:36
"Courage" (Burrell, Collins, Dennis) – 3:50
"Whether or not" (Burnell, Collins, Dennis) – 3:45
"Grow U Locks" (Burrell, Collins, Dennis, Dunbar) – 3:24
"This Day" (Burrell, Collins, Dennis, Edmund, Staff) – 4:09
"Attack" (Burrell, Collins, Dennis) – 3:33
"Glorify" (Burrell, Collins, Miller) – 3:54
"Wicked Naw Go Prosper" (Burrell, Collins, Wynter) – 4:03
"Good Looking" (Burrell, Collins, Dennis) – 3:28
"Do Good" (Burrell, Collins, Dennis) – 3:49
"Strength & Hope" (Burrell, Collins, Wynter) – 3:30
"Children Beware" (Burrell, Collins, Dennis, Miller) – 3:35
"Must Rise" (Burrell, Collins, Wynter) – 3:34

Personnel
 Paul Daley – engineer
 Donald Dennis – bass, guitar
 Mark Harrison  – engineer
 Tony McDermott – design
 Garfield McDonald – mixing
 Chris Meredith – bass
 Kevin Metcalfe – mastering
 J. Miller – drums
 Robert Murphy – engineer, mixing
 William Richards – photography
 David Rowe – mixing
 Nigel Staff – keyboards
 Stephen Stanley – keyboards, mixing
 Toby Whelan – engineer
 Collin "Bulbie" York – mixing

References

External links
 [ Review] at Allmusic
 Sizzla's website
 Greensleeves website

2000 albums
Sizzla albums